Pacelli is an Italian surname. Notable people with the surname include:

Asprilio Pacelli (1570–1623), Italian Baroque composer
Ernesto Pacelli  (died 1925), Vatican financial adviser, cousin of Pius XII
Eugenio Pacelli (1876–1958), Pope Pius XII
Francesco Pacelli (1872–1935), Vatican lawyer, elder brother of Pius XII
Frank Pacelli (1934–1999), American TV personality
Vincent "Vinny Basile" Pacelli, American Mafioso indicted in Operation Old Bridge
William V. Pacelli (1893–1942), American politician

Italian-language surnames